Matthew David John Walker (born 17 January 1977) is a former New Zealand cricketer who played three One Day Internationals for New Zealand against Pakistan in 2003.

References

1977 births
Living people
New Zealand cricketers
New Zealand One Day International cricketers
Central Districts cricketers
Wellington cricketers
People from Ōpunake